Charles Wallace may refer to:
Charles William Wallace (1865–1932), American scholar and researcher
Charles William Wallace (1855–1916), Anglo-Indian co-founder of Shaw Wallace
Charles Wallace (cricketer) (1899–1984), English cricketer
Charles Judson Wallace (born 1982), basketball player
Blondy Wallace (died 1937), American football player
Charles L. Wallace (1871–1949), Irish-born American architect
Charles Wallace Murry, or Charles Wallace, a fictional character
Charlie Wallace (1885–1970), English footballer
Charles Wallace Midgley (1885–1942), English footballer

See also

Charles Wallis (disambiguation)